The MV Nisqually was a  formerly operated by Washington State Ferries.

Originally built as the MV Mendocino in San Francisco for Northwestern Pacific Railroad, she started out serving Southern Pacific Railways on their Golden Gate Ferries line on San Francisco Bay.  She was purchased by the Puget Sound Navigation Company in 1940, and moved to Puget Sound where she was renamed the MV Nisqually, later being acquired by Washington State Ferries who took over operations in 1951.

On November 20, 2007, the entire Steel Electric class was withdrawn from service due to hull corrosion issues. The Nisqually was not in service at the time.

Washington State Ferries sold the Nisqually and her sister ferries to Eco Planet Recycling, Inc. of Chula Vista, California for scrap.  All four ferries were sold for $200,000.  The Nisqually and Quinault were towed out of Eagle Harbor on August 7, 2009, arriving in Ensenada, Mexico on August 16. Presumably, the Nisqually was cut up sometime between February and April 2011.

Incidents
One notable accident happened in July 1963 when the Nisqually was working on the Edmonds-Kingston route. It was heading to Edmonds when a tanker hit it. No one was hurt, but the ferry suffered major damage though. If the hull was not sponsoned out  in 1958, the ferry would have sunk.

References

Washington State Ferries vessels
Puget Sound Navigation Company
1927 ships
Ships built in San Francisco